Brigadier des armées navales was a naval rank in the French Navy during the ancien Régime. The rank was created by an edict on 25 March 1765, renamed Chef de Division on 1 January 1786. It was senior to Capitaine de vaisseau, and junior to Chef d'escadre.

History 
The rank of Brigadier des armées navales was introduced on 25 March 1765, and automatically bestowed upon the 50 most senior Captains in the Navy. It was the most senior  rank in the Navy below general officers, similar to a Brigadier in the Army.

On 1 January 1786, Navy Minister Castries renamed the rank to "Chef de Division" and limited their number to 27.

Sources and references 
 Notes

Citations

References

 

Military ranks of France
Navy of the Ancien Régime
Naval ranks